Oracle is an EP by Sunn O))). The track "Orakalum" was recorded as part of a collaboration between the band and sculptor/installation artist Banks Violette for an exhibit at London's Maureen Paley gallery. The exhibit took place in two rooms: one with a black stage where the band recorded "Orakulum" with Attila Csihar locked inside a white coffin, and one with a white replica of the band's stage set up (including amps and guitars) cast out of salt and resin with a destroyed black coffin. The audience was locked outside for the performance and let inside after the band left "to generate a feeling of absence, loss and a phantom of what was."

Track listing

Oracle
"Belülről Pusztít" – 16:01
"Orakulum" – 18:37

Limited Edition Bonus Disc
"Helio)))sophist" – 46:17

Musicians
Greg Anderson
Stephen O'Malley
Attila Csihar
Atsuo
Joe Preston
Tos Nieuwenhuizen
Oren Ambarchi

References

2007 albums
Southern Lord Records albums
Sunn O))) albums
Ambient albums by American artists
Drone music albums by American artists